

Walter Fries (22 April 1894 – 6 August 1982) was a German general in the Wehrmacht of Nazi Germany during World War II. He was a recipient of the Knight's Cross of the Iron Cross with Oak Leaves and Swords.

Awards
 Iron Cross (1914) 2nd and 1st Class
 Clasp to the Iron Cross (1939) 2nd Class (24 September 1939) & 1st Class (9 October 1939)
 Eastern Front Medal (18 July 1942)
 German Cross in Gold on 9 October 1942 as Oberst in Infanterie-Regiment 87 (mot.)
 Knight's Cross of the Iron Cross with Oak Leaves and Swords
 Knight's Cross on 14 December 1941 as Oberst and commander of the Infanterie-Regiment 87 (mot.)
 Oak Leaves on 29 January 1944 as Generalleutnant and commander of the 29. Panzergrenadier-Division
 Swords on 11 August 1944 as Generalleutnant and commander of the 29. Panzergrenadier-Division

References
Citations

Bibliography

 
 
 

1894 births
1982 deaths
Military personnel from Hesse
Generals of Panzer Troops
German Army personnel of World War I
Recipients of the clasp to the Iron Cross, 1st class
Recipients of the Gold German Cross
Recipients of the Knight's Cross of the Iron Cross with Oak Leaves and Swords
German prisoners of war in World War II held by the United States
Reichswehr personnel
People from Lahn-Dill-Kreis